"Tu canción" is a song performed by Spanish singers Amaia Romero and Alfred García, and written by Raúl Gómez and Sylvia Santoro. The performing duo is identified and credited as Amaia y Alfred. The song was released as a digital download on 28 January 2018 through Universal Music Spain. It represented Spain in the Eurovision Song Contest 2018 in Lisbon, Portugal. It finished in twenty-third place.

An English-language version, "Your Song", was released as a digital download on 27 April 2018. The lyrics were adapted into English by Paula Rojo.

Eurovision Song Contest

On 4 December 2017, the Spanish broadcaster Televisión Española (TVE) confirmed that they would use the successful music reality program Operación Triunfo to select their act for the Eurovision Song Contest 2018. It was later revealed on 20 December that the final five singers of the program's ninth series would perform in "Gala Eurovisión", which would be where the Spanish public would choose both the song and its performers for the Eurovision Song Contest. The nine competing songs were unveiled on 23 January 2018. Gala Eurovisión was held on 29 January. "Tu canción" was one of the top three songs in the first round of voting, qualifying to the second round where it won with 43% of the vote.

As Spain is a member of the "Big Five", the song automatically advanced to the final, held on 12 May 2018 in Lisbon, Portugal. It was the second song to be performed. It placed twenty-third out of the 26 participating countries with 61 points: 43 from the professional juries and 18 from the televote.

Live performances
Alfred & Amaia performed the song live for the first time on Gala Eurovisión of Operación Triunfo 2017 on 29 January 2018, where they were selected to represent Spain at the Eurovision Song Contest 2018. On 13 February, they performed the song again on Gala OT Fiesta of Operación Triunfo 2017. On 26 February, they performed an acoustic version on talk show El Hormiguero on Antena 3. On 11 March, they performed the acoustic version on talk show Viva la vida on Telecinco. Alfred & Amaia performed the song on the Premios Dial awards show at the Auditorio de Tenerife in Santa Cruz, aired live on Divinity on 15 March. On 24 March, they performed the song on the La noche de Cadena 100 charity concert at the WiZink Center in Madrid, aired live on Divinity. On 25 March, they performed as guests on competitive dance reality television series Fama, a bailar, aired on #0. On 5 April, they performed during the London Eurovision Party, which was held at the Café de Paris venue in London, United Kingdom. They also performed during the Israel Calling event which was held at Rabin Square in Tel Aviv, Israel on 10 April. On 14 April, Alfred & Amaia performed during the Eurovision in Concert event which was held at the AFAS Live venue in Amsterdam, Netherlands. On 21 April, they performed the song during the Eurovision-Spain Pre-Party event which will was held at the Sala La Riviera venue in Madrid. On 27 April, they performed the English version "Your Song" for the first time during the concert event Amaia, Alfred y amigos.

Amaia & Alfred performed the song live during the final of the Eurovision Song Contest 2018 at the Altice Arena in Lisbon, Portugal on 12 May 2018.

Music video 
The official video of the song, directed by Gus Carballo, was filmed in February 2018 at studio in Madrid. The video premiered on 9 March 2018 on a special prime time broadcast on La 1, hosted by Roberto Leal.

Track listing

Charts

Weekly charts

Year-end charts

Certifications

Release history

References

2018 singles
2018 songs
Eurovision songs of 2018
Eurovision songs of Spain
Spanish-language songs
Universal Music Spain singles